In fluid mechanics, internal flow is a flow wherein the fluid is completely confined by inner surfaces of an item (e.g. a tube). Hence the boundary layer is unable to develop without eventually being constrained. The internal flow configuration represents a convenient geometry for heating and cooling fluids used in chemical processing, environmental control, and energy conversion technologies.

An example includes flow in a pipe.

References

Fluid mechanics